Ra (also known as The Ra Expeditions) is a 1972 documentary film directed by Lennart Ehrenborg and Thor Heyerdahl about the expeditions organised by Thor Heyerdahl in 1969 and 1970 in attempt to cross the Atlantic on papyrus boats. It was nominated for an Academy Award for Best Documentary Feature.

Cast
 Norman Baker
 Roscoe Lee Browne as Narrator
 Abdullah Djibrine
 Santiago Genovés
 Thor Heyerdahl as Himself
 Carlo Mauri
 Kei Ohara
 Madanni Ait Ouhanni
 Yuri Senkevich
 Georges Sourial

References

External links
 
 

1972 films
1972 documentary films
Films directed by Thor Heyerdahl
Swedish documentary films
Norwegian documentary films
Documentary films about water transport
Anthropology documentary films
1970s English-language films
1970s Swedish films